The Apple Performa Plus Display is a color 14″, 13″ viewable shadow mask CRT that was manufactured by Apple Inc. from September 14, 1992, until July 18, 1994.  The video cable uses a standard Macintosh DA-15 video connector and its resolution is fixed at 640×480 pixels.

References 
 EveryMac.com

Apple Inc. displays